Events in the year 1862 in Iceland.

Incumbents 

 Monarch: Frederick VII of Denmark
 Council President of Denmark: Carl Christian Hall

Events 

 Skútustaðakirkja is constructed.

Births 

 Olafur Davidsson, natural scientist, ethnographer and folklore collector.
 Jón Stefánsson, scholar.

References 

 
1860s in Iceland
Years of the 19th century in Iceland
Iceland
Iceland